OMC, or Otara Millionaires Club, were a New Zealand music group, then duo, with vocalist Pauly Fuemana later becoming the sole member. OMC was best known for the 1995 hit "How Bizarre", named one of the greatest New Zealander songs of all time by the Australasian Performing Right Association. The full name of the band is a tongue-in-cheek reference to Otara's status as one of the poorest suburbs of Auckland.

Career

Origin (1992–1995)
The Otara Millionaires Club was formed in 1992 by Phil Fuemana, who had played in the bands Houseparty and Fuemana. Fuemana and his younger brother Pauly Fuemana recorded two tracks as the new band for producer Alan Jansson's Urban Pacifica collection Proud. Jansson had achieved cult status as composer/producer for the synthpop group Body Electric during the early 1980s.
In 1994, after the split of the Otara Millionaires Club, Pauly approached Jansson and the two formed a musical partnership, with Fuemana the public face and Jansson as producer and co-writer. Pauly suggested that they shorten the band's name to just the initials, and thereafter, Fuemana Jansson were OMC. Pauly performed as OMC, serving as the frontman and playing several instruments during performances. However, the music was created by Pauly and Alan Jansson, with Jansson co-writing all of the tracks and handling most of the arrangement and all production duties in the studio.

How Bizarre (1995–1997)

Signed to Simon Grigg's Huh! label, OMC released the single "How Bizarre" in New Zealand in late 1995. It was an immediate smash hit even without a video, reaching number one in early 1996 and staying there for three weeks. It sold over 35,000 copies.

The same year, "How Bizarre" went to number one in Australia for five weeks, sold over 150,000 singles, and was certified as a platinum single. Later in the year the single went to number 5 in the UK Singles Chart and number one in countries across Europe and much of the rest of the world.

In the United States, "How Bizarre" spent 32 weeks on Billboard'''s Mainstream Top 40 chart, peaking at number one in August 1997 due to the large amount of radio play it received. This made OMC the first New Zealand artist to reach the number one spot on a Billboard chart. The song never charted on the regular Billboard Hot 100 as it was not released as a commercially available single in the US, which was a chart-eligibility requirement at the time. It also became a BMI-certified "million airplay" song two years in a row.

OMC's third single, "On the Run", reached number 56 on the UK in 1997.

In 1996, OMC's debut album, also entitled How Bizarre, was released. The album sold in the United States in excess of a million copies, and charted in many other countries. Between 1995 and 2000, world-wide OMC sales are estimated at between three and four million records.

Follow-up success (1997–2010)
"How Bizarre" was followed by the singles "Land of Plenty" which reached the top 5 in the New Zealand charts; "Right On" which achieved platinum-status in New Zealand; and "On The Run" which was a minor international hit in the Netherlands and the UK. By 1998, Fuemana and Jansson had a falling out over royalties, which ended up in court. It was resolved in arbitration with Fuemana paying a sum to Jansson and Jansson handing over all claim to the name and ongoing artist royalties.

Fuemana and Jansson regrouped in 2005 and released the single "4 All of Us", featuring the actress Lucy Lawless as a guest vocalist, in 2007.

In 2002, their song "How Bizarre" reached #71 on the 100 Greatest One-hit Wonders hosted by William Shatner.

Death of Pauly and Phil
Phil died in 2005 of a heart attack.

On 31 January 2010, Pauly Fuemana died at North Shore Hospital in Auckland after suffering for several years from a chronic degenerative disease, progressive demyelinating polyneuropathy, an auto-immune disorder similar to the nerve disease multiple sclerosis. He was 40 years old, and was survived by his wife and six children. In February 2010, "How Bizarre" briefly reentered the charts in New Zealand following news of Pauly Fuemana's death.

Discography
Album

Singles

Awards
New Zealand Music Awards
The New Zealand Music Awards are an annual awards night celebrating excellence in New Zealand music and have been presented annually since 1965.

! 
|-
| rowspan="4" | 1996 || OMC || Most Promising Group ||  || rowspan="10" | 
|-
| Paul Fuemana (OMC) || Most Promising Male||  
|-
| "How Bizarre" || Single of the Year ||  
|-
| Alan Jansson for "How Bizarre" (OMC) || Engineer of the Year||  
|-
| rowspan="5" | 1997 || How Bizarre || Album of the Year ||  
|-
| Rick Huntington & Alan Jansson for How Bizarre by OMC || Album Cover of the Year || 
|-
| Rick Huntington & Alan Jansson for How Bizarre by OMC || Engineer of the Year || 
|-
| Alan Jansson for How Bizarre'' by OMC || Producer of the Year || 
|-
| OMC || International Achievement || 
|-
| 1998 || OMC || International Achievement || 
|-

References

External links

APRA Award winners
New Zealand pop music groups
New Zealand musical duos
Mercury Records artists
Musical groups established in 1993
Musical groups disestablished in 2010
1993 establishments in New Zealand
Male musical duos
Hip hop duos
Rock music duos
New Zealand pop rock groups